Kazi Sherpa as confirmed by the Everest Summiteers Association, and as confirmed by Everest historian Elizabeth Hawley, holds the current speed climbing record on Mount Everest for the South Col Route, from basecamp to the summit, without oxygen from basecamp to the summit.

Kazi's record was set on the South Col Route, without supplemental oxygen, without steroid drug assistance (Dexamethasone), and without Sherpa assistance or guide assistance. Set in 1998, his time was 20 hours 24 minutes, from the basecamp to the summit, thereby breaking the previous record set by Marc Batard ten years earlier in 1988 by 22 hours and 29 minutes.

References

See also
Mount Everest records
List of 20th-century summiters of Mount Everest
List of Mount Everest records

Living people
Nepalese mountain climbers
Nepalese summiters of Mount Everest
Date of birth missing (living people)
Year of birth missing (living people)